Clinoid process may refer to:

 Anterior clinoid process
 Middle clinoid process
 Posterior clinoid processes